The Palace of Ramalhão is a neoclassical Palace in Sintra, Portugal. The palace has its origins in a small farm that was enlarged into a palace by Luis Garcia de Bivar in 1470.  It was at this palace where D. Carlota Joaquina of Spain frequently stayed after 1802, and where she was exiled after refusing to swear to the Constitution of 1822. The building is decorated in a Louis XVI neoclassical style.  The palace interior includes  exotic frescos attributed to the painter Manuel da Costa, one of the decorators of the Palace of Queluz.

See also 
 Carlota Joaquina of Spain 
 Sintra

Sources 
 (Portuguese) Palácio e Quinta do Ramalhão

External links 

Royal residences in Portugal
Palaces in Portugal
Neoclassical architecture in Portugal
Buildings and structures in Sintra
Palaces in Lisbon District